The women's heptathlon at the 2014 World Junior Championships in Athletics was held at the Hayward Field on 22 and 23 July.

Medalists

Records
, the records were as follows:

Schedule

Results

100 metres hurdles
The event commenced at 09:59 on 22 July. Wind: −0.8, +1.1, +0.3 m/s.

High jump
The event commenced at 11:03 on 22 July.

Shot put
The event commenced at 18:00 on 22 July.

200 metres
The event commenced at 19:22 on 22 July. Wind: +1.2, +0.5, -0.5 m/s.

Long jump
The event commenced at 11:43 on 23 July.

Javelin throw
The event commenced at 13:38 on 23 July.

800 metres
The event commenced at 19:06 on 23 July.

Final standings
The combined summary was as follows:

References

External links
 WJC14 Heptathlon Schedule on IAAF website

Heptathlon
Combined events at the World Athletics U20 Championships
2014 in women's athletics